The 1961 Turkish presidential election was the election to elect the fourth President of Turkey. In the election held on October 26, 1961, 607 out of 638 deputies participated in the voting. The Chairman of the National Unity Committee, Cemal Gürsel, was elected to the Presidency with 434 votes in the first round.

Election

See also 
 October 21 Protocol
 Ali Fuat Başgil

References 

Elections in Turkey

Single-candidate elections